William Alexander Campbell (March 31, 1873 – September 6, 1934) was a provincial politician from Alberta, Canada. He served as a member of the Legislative Assembly of Alberta from 1909 to 1917 sitting with the Liberal caucus in government.

Political career
Campbell was elected to the Alberta Legislature for the first time in the 1909 Alberta general election. He defeated Conservative candidate John Jackson by a comfortable plurality.

Campbell sought re-election again in the 1913 Alberta general election, where he defeated Independent candidate Percival Baker and Conservative candidate George Gordon in a hotly contested three-candidate election.

Charles Cunningham from the Conservative party defeated Campbell in his bid for a third term in office in the 1917 Alberta general election by a margin of 31 votes.

Baker and Campbell faced off again in the 1921 Alberta general election, were Campbell was again defeated.

References

External links
Legislative Assembly of Alberta Members Listing

Alberta Liberal Party MLAs
1873 births
1934 deaths